The Cook Islands records in swimming are the fastest ever performances of swimmers from Cook Islands, which are recognised and ratified by the Cook Islands Aquatics Federation. Due to the lack of a swimming pool, only open water swimming is practiced in the Cook Islands. 

All records were set in finals unless noted otherwise.

Long Course (50 m)

Men

Women

Short Course (25 m)

Men

Women

References

External links
 Cook Islands Aquatics Federation web site

Cook Islands
Records
Swimming